Nuagan is a town in Nayagarh district of Odisha state of India.

Geography

Location
National Highway 227 Khurda-Balangir passes through Nuagan  is around 16  km west of Balugaon, on the Dashapalla- Nayagarh - Chandapur road, in Nayagarh district. It is about 14 km from Dashapalla, 10 km south of Madhyakandha and 25 km north of Odagan.

The nearest picnic spots are Kuanria Deer Park, Baisipali Wildlife Sanctuary and Kuanria Dam.

Khurda Road Junction Railway Station, on the Visakhapatnam-Cuttack rail route, serves the place. Biju Patnaik Airport in Bhubaneswar is the nearest airport.

References

External links
 About Nuagan
 Satellite map of Nuagan

Cities and towns in Nayagarh district